Xaa-Xaa-Pro tripeptidyl-peptidase (prolyltripeptidyl amino peptidase, prolyl tripeptidyl peptidase, prolyltripeptidyl aminopeptidase, PTP-A, TPP) is an enzyme. It catalyses the following chemical reaction

 Hydrolysis of Xaa-Xaa-Pro!Yaa- releasing the N-terminal tripeptide of a peptide with Pro as the third residue (position P1) and where Yaa is not proline

This cell-surface-associated serine exopeptidase is found in the Gram-negative, anaerobic bacterium Porphyromonas gingivalis.

References

External links 
 

EC 3.4.14